Hildebrandt is a German surname. Notable people with the surname include:

The Brothers Hildebrandt (Greg and Tim Hildebrandt) (b. 1939), twin brothers, comic book and fantasy artists
Kristine Hildebrandt, American professor of linguistics
Dieter Hildebrandt (1927–2013), German cabaret artist
Edmund Hildebrandt (1872–1939), German art historian
Eduard Hildebrandt (1818–1868), German artist
Ernst-Albrecht Hildebrandt (1895–1970), Nazi SS-Oberführer, and SS and Police Leader
Franz Hildebrandt (1909-1985), German Theologian
Fred H. Hildebrandt (1874–1956), American politician; U.S. representative from South Dakota
Friedhelm Hildebrandt (b. 1957), German Geneticist and Pediatrician
Friedrich Hildebrandt (1898–1948), German SS Obergruppenführer, a Gauleiter, and executed for war crimes
Georg Friedrich Hildebrandt (1764–1816), German pharmacist, chemist, and anatomist
Heinz Hildebrandt (b. 1921), German politician
Henry Hildebrandt (b. 1963), Canadian religious leader
Johann Lukas von Hildebrandt (1668–1745), Austrian architect; designer of palaces
Johann Maria Hildebrandt, (1847–1881), German explorer and collector
Johann Hildebrandt (disambiguation)
Johanne Hildebrandt (b. 1964), Swedish author and journalist
Jürgen Hildebrandt (b. 1948), German handball player and trainer
Martha Hildebrandt (1925–2022), Peruvian linguist and politician
Mitch Hildebrandt (b. 1988), American football (soccer) goalkeeper
Regine Hildebrandt (1941–2001), German biologist and politician
Richard Hildebrandt (1897-1951), Nazi politician and SS-Obergruppenführer executed for war crimes
Steen Hildebrandt (born 1944), Danish academic 
Theodor Hildebrandt (1804–1874), German artist
Theophil Henry Hildebrandt (1888-1980), American mathematician 
Zacharias Hildebrandt (1688–1757), German master organ builder

See also
 Hildebrandt (airship), German airship named after Alfred Hildebrandt that crashed December 28, 1910 in Pomerania, Germany, killing two men
Hildebrandt's moringa, tree species
Hoy con Cesar Hildebrandt, Peruvian political television show
Hildebrand (disambiguation)

Surnames from given names
German-language surnames
Russian Mennonite surnames